APU/Citrus College station is an at-grade light rail station on the L Line of the Los Angeles Metro Rail system. It is located between Palm Drive and Citrus Avenue, a block north of Foothill Boulevard, in Azusa, California. It is named after the nearby Azusa Pacific University (APU) and Citrus College.

This station opened on March 5, 2016, as part of Phase 2A of the Foothill Extension, and currently serves as the northern terminus of the L Line. Phase 2B of the Foothill Extension will open to Pomona in 2026.

This station and all the other original and Foothill Extension stations will be part of the A Line upon completion of the Regional Connector project in 2023.

Due to heavy rain in March 2016, the previously delayed underpass construction on North Citrus Avenue was flooded. The Citrus Avenue extension and underpass was finally opened in September 2016.

Service

Station layout

Hours and frequency

Connections 
, the following connections are available:
 Glendora Transportation Division: Gold Line Shuttle North Route, Gold Line Shuttle South Route

References 

Railway stations in the United States opened in 2016
Citrus College
L Line (Los Angeles Metro) stations
Azusa, California
Azusa Pacific University
2016 establishments in California
Railway stations in California at university and college campuses
Pacific Electric stations